Guest of Honour is a 2019 Canadian drama film, written, directed, and produced by Atom Egoyan. It stars David Thewlis,  Laysla De Oliveira, Rossif Sutherland, Alexandre Bourgeois, Arsinée Khanjian and Luke Wilson.

The film had its world premiere at the 76th Venice International Film Festival on September 3, 2019. It was released on July 10, 2020, by Elevation Pictures.

Plot

Similar to many of Egoyan's other films, Guest of Honour features a narrative structure that alternates between the past and present. In the present day, Veronica meets with a priest, Father Greg, in his church to discuss funeral arrangements for her recently deceased father, Jim. Their conversation reveals details of Jim and Veronica's lives which are shown through a series of flashbacks. Father Greg expresses some confusion as to why Jim wished to have his funeral at this particular church given that Jim was not a member of the congregation. He agrees to allow the funeral to take place at his church, but he first asks Veronica to share more information about Jim's life so that he is prepared to give a eulogy at the funeral. Veronica emphasizes Jim's commitment to his work as a food inspector and his ability to care for the family's pet rabbit, Benjamin, who died at the improbable age of 16.

Prior to his death, Jim was a food safety inspector working for the City of Hamilton. He took his job very seriously, and his strict adherence to the health and safety code often led to clashes with restaurant owners, many of whom are immigrants who may not be familiar with Canadian food safety standards. Jim would also regularly visit Veronica in prison where she was previously serving a sentence for having had sexual relations with an underage teenage boy named Clive when she was a high school music teacher. However, Veronica did not actually commit this crime. To Jim's astonishment, Veronica inexplicably resists any attempt to secure her release from prison and she has no interest in speaking to her lawyer. She claims that she deserves to be in prison for what she did, hinting at something else she is guilty of in her past.

A flashback reveals the details of an overnight school band trip that leads to Veronica's imprisonment. A bus driver and chaperone, Mike, becomes spiteful of Clive's romantic interest in Veronica and her rejection of his own advances. During one of the band's performances, Mike uses Veronica's cell phone to send a sexually suggestive text message to Clive. Clive later approaches Veronica to inform her of the text message. He acknowledges that the message could not have sent by her because they were performing at the time the message was sent, and their phones were left on the school bus, a rule enforced by Veronica herself. They both conclude the obvious fact that Mike was the one who sent the text message using Veronica's phone, but they decide to pull a prank on Mike rather than reporting the incident. Later that night at a motel, Veronica, Clive, and another male student spend time alone in a room and purposely make a lot of noise to trick Mike into thinking that they are partying and having sex. Clive signals for the other student to move to the adjoining room to leave him alone with Veronica. Veronica begins to have a flashback to the suicide of her teenage boyfriend, Walter, causing her to panic and storm out of the room in plain sight of Mike who then confronts her.

Veronica explains to Father Greg that she entered a plea deal and asked for the longest sentence possible rather than allowing her case to proceed in court which would have allowed Clive and the other students to testify as witnesses and vindicate her. Father Greg is perplexed and asks Veronica why she would have been willing to go to jail for something she did not do. Veronica explains that she wanted to go to jail for something else she did in her past.

A series of flashbacks reveal that Veronica began regularly taking music lessons at the private residence of a woman named Alicia when she was eight years old. Alicia is a single mother who also teaches music to her son, Walter, who is of a similar age to Veronica, and the two children would go on to regularly perform together at recitals. Around this time, Veronica's mother, Roseangela, became very ill and passed away soon afterwards. Towards the end of Roseangela's life, Jim and Alicia began developing a romantic relationship which was facilitated in large part by Veronica's music lessons. Veronica resented this relationship and the possibility of Alicia becoming her new mother. Veronica's perception of Jim and Alicia's relationship continues to cause tension and disagreement between her and her father during their meetings in prison. Veronica claims that she remembers seeing her father holding hands with Alicia while she was performing at a musical recital despite the fact that her mother was still alive and in attendance, a charge which Jim denies and tries to disprove while emphasizing that he could never love anyone as much as Roseangela. Veronica also claims to remember seeing Alicia follow her father upstairs to presumably have sex during her music lessons which had merely become a pretext for their blossoming relationship. While Jim and Alicia were upstairs doing something, Veronica would be left alone in the piano room to write music.

During a music lesson with Veronica, Alicia experiences a migraine and retreats upstairs to lie down and smoke a cigarette. Veronica stays downstairs in the piano room to write a piece of music and then proceeds upstairs. As Veronica approaches a doorway, she sees Alicia asleep on a couch with a lit cigarette in her hand. Alicia's hand slips off the couch and lands on a stack of papers which catch fire. Veronica allows Alicia to burn to death in order to avoid the possibility of Alicia marrying Jim. Veronica and Walter later become romantically involved when they are teenagers. At some point in their relationship, Walter becomes aware of the circumstances regarding his mother's death. When Veronica breaks up with Walter, he becomes traumatized and then records a video using Veronica's cell phone blaming her for his mother's death and explaining his intention to commit suicide and join his mother in the underworld which Veronica sent her to, all while Veronica is sleeping. Veronica wakes up the next morning to find her cell phone on the nightstand with a sticky note affixed reading "watch later." She then finds Walter dead in a bloody bathtub. The deaths of Alicia and Walter are the source of Veronica's guilt and her desire to go to jail, details which she admits to Father Greg. Her conversation with Father Greg eventually leads to some closure for her as she begins to come to terms with the true nature of her father's relationship with Alicia and the traumatic incidents which have occurred throughout her life, and she begins to re-frame her perception of them. Two flashbacks reveal that Veronica's recollection of what was going on between Alicia and her father was mostly correct, but severely distorted.

Jim inspects an Armenian restaurant called Wild Orchid and discovers two major violations pertaining to their processing of rabbit meat in the kitchen. The restaurant owners convince Jim that the rabbit meat is for a private event and is not for sale during a regular dinner service, but he is skeptical and intends to come back to verify their claim. Later that week, Jim visits a popular German restaurant which is owned by Clive's family. He spreads some of Benjamin's feces, which he has altered to appear like rat droppings, on the bathroom floor. He threatens Clive's grandfather with a shutdown of the restaurant unless he is given an opportunity to speak privately with Clive who had been intentionally avoiding contact with Jim. During a tense conversation, Clive truthfully explains what happened during the school trip which led to Veronica's imprisonment, and he tells Jim that the bus driver was the one who sent the inappropriate text. He also tells Jim that he knows Veronica felt responsible for Walter's suicide. Later that night, Jim returns to Wild Orchid and discovers that there is in fact a special event taking place at the restaurant, and he is unexpectedly the family's guest of honour that evening. After drinking too much wine, he is invited to give a speech in which he expresses his anguish regarding Veronica's imprisonment despite the fact that she came from a loving home with parents who supported her and made sacrifices for her, to the bewilderment of the other guests who are not aware of Veronica's crime. He expresses his desire to kill the bus driver who was responsible, causing him to be reported to the police by the restaurant owners after they send him home in a taxi. While being interrogated by the police the next day, Jim notices that Benjamin, who was given to Veronica as a gift when she was nine, has suddenly died in his cage. Jim returns to Wild Orchid carrying Benjamin's dead body and demands that the restaurant owners cut off Benjamin's feet so that he can keep them as good luck charms. The mortified restaurant owners comply with the request in order to get Jim to leave.

During their final prison visitation, Jim tells Veronica about what happened at the restaurant and the visitation from the police. He explains that the police are suspicious of his regular visits to the prison because he and Veronica may be plotting to murder Mike. He explains that he got carried away during his speech and that the police are just doing their job by investigating the threat. Veronica excitedly asks if this means her sentence will be extended even further, causing a bewildered Jim to ask her what is wrong with her. Veronica explains that Jim, everything he has done, and everything she saw and endured as a child, is what is wrong with her, but also what is right with her.

At Jim's funeral, Father Greg tells a story about having met Jim briefly at the funeral of another parishioner, Alicia, and how Jim had told him about how important Alicia was to Veronica's musical education. Father Greg asks the parishioners in attendance to mourn the deaths of both Jim and Alicia. Veronica, now in possession of the good luck charms made from Benjamin's feet, asks Father Greg to place the charms in the casket with Jim's body after first keeping one for herself and gifting another to Father Greg. Father Greg places the remaining charms in Jim's hands and then closes the casket.

The final scene is a flashback to when Veronica was a music teacher. During a recital, she introduces the final piece of music on the program by explaining that it is a tune she wrote during a difficult time in her life when she was a girl. It is one of the songs she wrote when she was left alone in the piano room at Alicia's home.

Cast
 David Thewlis as Jim
 Luke Wilson as Father Greg
 Laysla De Oliveira as Veronica
 Rossif Sutherland as Mike
 Arsinée Khanjian as Anna
 Alexandre Bourgeois as Clive
 Gage Munroe as Walter
 Tennille Read as Roseangela
 Isabelle Franca as Young Veronica
 Alexander Marsh as Young Walter

Production
In September 2018, it was announced Atom Egoyan would direct the film from a screenplay he wrote. Egoyan, Jennifer Weiss and Simone Urdl will produce the film under their The Film Farm and Ego Film Art banners, respectively. Telefilm Canada will also produce the film, while Elevation Pictures will distribute. In November 2018, David Thewlis, Luke Wilson, Laysla De Oliveira, Rossif Sutherland and Alexandre Bourgeois joined the cast of the film.

Filming
Principal photography began in November 2018. The film was shot on location in Hamilton and Toronto, Ontario.

Release
The film had its world premiere at the 76th Venice International Film Festival on September 3, 2019. It also screened at the Toronto International Film Festival on September 10, 2019. and the BFI London Film Festival on October 8, 2019.

In February 2020, Kino Lorber acquired U.S. distribution rights to the film. It was released in the United States and Canada on July 10, 2020.

Critical reception
The site's critical consensus reads, "David Thewlis' performance aside, Guest of Honour serves as a frustratingly limited return to form for writer-director Atom Egoyan." On Metacritic, the film holds a rating of 53 out of 100, based on 13 critics, indicating "mixed or average reviews".

References

External links
 
 
 

2019 films
Canadian drama films
English-language Canadian films
Films directed by Atom Egoyan
Films scored by Mychael Danna
2010s English-language films
2010s Canadian films